The 1974 Volta a Catalunya was the 54th edition of the Volta a Catalunya cycle race and was held from 4 September to 11 September 1974. The race started in Lleida and finished in Manresa. The race was won by Bernard Thévenet.

General classification

References

1974
Volta
1974 in Spanish road cycling
September 1974 sports events in Europe